Philip Ronald Cleary (born 8 December 1952) is an Australian commentator on politics and sport, particularly Australian rules football, and a former independent politician elected at the 1992 Wills by-election.

Football playing career
Cleary first came to notice as a prominent player and coach in Victoria's second-level Australian rules football competition, the Victorian Football Association, for the Coburg Football Club. He debuted with the club in 1975, playing 205 games—second only to Dave Starbuck in Coburg club history—and kicking 317 goals. He was a member of the 1979 premiership side and losing 1980 side.  He coached the club between 1984 and 1992 (captain coach between 1984 and 1987, upon which he retired as a player), before leading them to back-to-back premierships in 1988–89. In the 1986 VFA grand final against Williamstown he was sensationally ordered off, only to be found not guilty at the tribunal. He coached the VFA representative side on five occasions without losing a game. He was one of the most well-known players in the VFA in his era, and was instantly recognisable from the thick beard he wore throughout his career.

He has had various coaching and mentoring roles in the Essendon District Football League over the past 10 years.

Political career
At the Wills by-election of 11 April 1992, caused by the resignation of former Prime Minister Bob Hawke, Phil Cleary was elected as an independent to the Australian House of Representatives from a field of 22 candidates, becoming the only non-Labor member to have ever held the seat. However, his election was successfully challenged in the High Court and declared void on 25 November, as Cleary was on unpaid leave from the Victorian Education Department, and the Section 44 of the Constitution of Australia forbids people employed by the Crown from standing for election. No second by-election was held, as a general election was expected within a few months. At the 13 March 1993 election, Cleary stood again and won again.

Cleary lost the seat to Labor at the 1996 federal election. Wills had undergone a redistribution, by adding territory to the division, which weakened Cleary's notional position against Labor. Cleary's vote of 22.7% was a decrease of 6.7% from the 29.4% he polled in 1993, on different boundaries.

While advocating an Australian Republic, he broke with the Australian Republican Movement (ARM) over disagreement about how the President of Australia should be chosen, forming a group called "Real Republic", which advocated direct election of the President as opposed to the model advocated by Malcolm Turnbull of the ARM, under which the President would be chosen by a joint sitting of the Parliament, and which was the model proposed in the 1999 referendum.

Cleary nominated to contest the seat of Brunswick at the 2010 Victorian State Election as an Independent.

Post-politics
Cleary was a part of the ABC’s telecast of VFA/VFL football as a match-day commentator from 1987 until the ABC lost the rights in 2014, juggling coaching and commentary duties for the first five seasons. He conducted interviews and acted as a boundary rider for the match of the day, writes a weekly column for the football magazine Inside Football, and regularly appears in the media on a range of social and political issues. He has campaigned to stop male violence against women since his sister was murdered by her former partner in 1987. He is a freelance journalist and public speaker and is the author of three books: Cleary Independent, Just Another Little Murder, and Getting Away with Murder.

Defamation incident
In a much-published defamation case in 2010, it was alleged that, in his 2005 book Getting Away with Murder, Cleary had accused barrister Dyson Hore-Lacy of helping a man who killed his own wife to manufacture a provocation defence. Hore-Lacy won the case and was awarded $630,000 in damages.

Bibliography

 Cleary, P. 1998, Cleary Independent, HarperCollins Publishers. 
 Cleary, P. 2003, Just Another Little Murder, Allen & Unwin. 
 Cleary, P. 2005, Getting Away With Murder: The True Story of Julie Ramage's Death, Allen & Unwin.

References

External links
Phil Cleary Official Website

1952 births
Living people
Australian people of Irish descent
Australian rules football commentators
Australian rules footballers from Melbourne
Australian sportsperson-politicians
Coburg Football Club players
Coburg Football Club coaches
Delegates to the Australian Constitutional Convention 1998
20th-century Australian politicians
Independent members of the Parliament of Australia
Members of the Australian House of Representatives for Wills
Members of the Australian House of Representatives
Politicians from Melbourne
People educated at St Joseph's College, Melbourne